Tireh may refer to:

Tireh, Markazi
Tireh, Qom